Lionel Nshole Makondi (born 25 February 1995) is a footballer who plays for Belgian club Eendracht Termien as a striker. Born in Belgium, he represented DR Congo at under-20 international level.

Club career 
Makondi made his Belgian Pro League debut for Mechelen on 9 August 2014 against Kortrijk. He replaced Sofiane Hanni as a 75th-minute substitute.

References

External links
 

1995 births
Living people
People from Balen
Association football forwards
Belgian footballers
Belgian people of Democratic Republic of the Congo descent
Democratic Republic of the Congo footballers
Democratic Republic of the Congo youth international footballers
K.V.C. Westerlo players
K.V. Mechelen players
VV UNA players
Belgian Pro League players
Tweede Divisie players
Democratic Republic of the Congo expatriate footballers
Belgian expatriate footballers
Expatriate footballers in the Netherlands
Democratic Republic of the Congo expatriate sportspeople in the Netherlands
Belgian expatriate sportspeople in the Netherlands
Footballers from Antwerp Province